Alayna Ertl was a missing 5-year-old girl from Watkins, Minnesota who was later found murdered. She went missing on Saturday, August 20, 2016, and was last seen alive around 2am Central Daylight Time, according to the Amber Alert that was issued for her. When her parents woke up at 8am Saturday, they noted that their daughter, their pickup truck, and the house guest who had stayed with them overnight were gone. After her parents reported her missing, her father's cell phone in the truck pinged a cell tower in Todd County, Minnesota giving a clue to where she might be. Her body was located nine hours later in Cass county near the Wilderness Park  in a swampy area.

The overnight guest, Zachary Todd Anderson, a softball teammate of the girl's father, is believed to have stolen the family's white 2002 GMC Sierra pickup truck during the abduction. He was located in a secluded area around 4:20pm Central Time. Police had tracked the vehicle to Anderson's family's cabin, which was unoccupied when they arrived.
When police located Anderson, he was standing knee-deep in a swamp behind the cabin with his wrists slashed. He eventually led them to Alayna's body, which was completely submerged under water.
An autopsy found evidence of sexual assault, and determined the cause of death to be strangulation and blunt force trauma to the head.

On March 2, 2018, Anderson pleaded guilty to a charge of first-degree murder while committing first-degree criminal sexual conduct. He received Minnesota's mandatory sentence of life in prison without the possibility of parole.

See also
List of kidnappings

References

External links
 Alayna Ertl case articles from the Star Tribune newspaper

2016 in Minnesota
2016 murders in the United States
Deaths by person in Minnesota
Formerly missing people
Cass County, Minnesota
Kidnapped American children
Murdered American children
Incidents of violence against girls